This is a list of episodes of the Canadian television sitcom The Smart Woman Survival Guide.

Season 1 (2006)

Season 2 (2007)

Season 3 (2007–08)

External links

Lists of sitcom episodes
Lists of Canadian television series episodes